The Ninth Philippine Legislature was the meeting of the legislature of the Philippines under the sovereign control of the United States from 1931 to 1934.

Members

Senate 

Notes

House of Representatives 

Notes

See also
Congress of the Philippines
Senate of the Philippines
House of Representatives of the Philippines

Further reading
Philippine House of Representatives Congressional Library

References

09